Killintown is a townland in County Westmeath, Ireland. It contains the western part of the small lake, Lough Patrick, the remainder being in Stonehall.

Killintown is one of 11 townlands of the civil parish of Stonehall in the barony of Corkaree in the Province of Leinster. 

The neighbouring townlands are: Lismalady and Ballinriddera to the north, Stonehall to the east, Larkinstown and Tyfarnham to the south and Multyfarnham or Fearbranagh to the west.

In the 1911 census of Ireland there were 3 houses and 12 inhabitants in the townland.

References

External links
Map of Killintown at openstreetmap.org
Killintown at the IreAtlas Townland Data Base
Killintown at Townlands.ie
Killintown at The Placenames Database of Ireland

Townlands of County Westmeath